Márvio dos Santos (17 March 1934 – 26 February 1990) was a Brazilian water polo player. He competed at the 1952 Summer Olympics, the 1960 Summer Olympics and the 1964 Summer Olympics.

See also
 Brazil men's Olympic water polo team records and statistics

References

External links
 

1934 births
1990 deaths
Brazilian male water polo players
Olympic water polo players of Brazil
Water polo players at the 1952 Summer Olympics
Water polo players at the 1960 Summer Olympics
Water polo players at the 1964 Summer Olympics
Place of birth missing
20th-century Brazilian people